Northumberland House is a Grade II listed house at 134 New King's Road, Fulham, London, built in the early 18th century.

It is next door to Claybrook House, and two doors away from 128 New King's Road.

References

External links
 

Grade II listed buildings in the London Borough of Hammersmith and Fulham
Houses in the London Borough of Hammersmith and Fulham
New King's Road
Grade II listed houses in London
Houses completed in the 18th century